Kalman Laki (February 1, 1909 – February 12, 1983), sometimes referred to as Koloman Laki, was a Hungarian-American biochemist who contributed to the discovery of factor XIII. He was a National Institutes of Health (NIH) scientist.

Biography
Born in Szolnok, Hungary, Laki completed doctoral studies in chemistry at the University of Szeged before coming to the United States in 1947 as an NIH scientist. He was the chief of the biophysical chemistry laboratory at the National Institute of Arthritis, Diabetes, Digestive and Kidney Diseases. In 1970, he became the head of a physical biochemistry laboratory at the institute.

Laki and biochemist Laszlo Lorand (whom Laki had recruited to Albert Szent-Györgyi's laboratory when Lorand was a medical student) worked on biochemical research in coagulation. A substance they identified, initially named Laki–Lorand factor, became known as factor XIII. Laki was awarded an honorary medical degree from the University of Debrecen.

Laki died at Fairfax Hospital in 1983. He had been in the hospital after minor surgery when he had a heart attack.

References

1909 births
1983 deaths
Hungarian biochemists
National Institutes of Health people
University of Szeged alumni
Recipients of the Kossuth Prize
Hungarian emigrants to the United States